Tyrone Bell (born October 20, 1974) is a former defensive back in the National Football League.

Biography
Bell was born Tyrone Edward Bell in West Point, Mississippi.

Career
Bell was drafted in the sixth round of the 1999 NFL Draft by the San Diego Chargers and would spend that season with the Green Bay Packers. He played at the collegiate level at the University of North Alabama. He also played for the BC Lions and Memphis Maniax.

Other work
Bell is currently a Senior Vice President of Primerica Financial Services in Huntsville, Alabama.

See also

List of Green Bay Packers players

References

External links
Just Sports Stats

1974 births
Living people
People from West Point, Mississippi
Players of American football from Mississippi
Green Bay Packers players
American football defensive backs
North Alabama Lions football players
Primerica
BC Lions players
Memphis Maniax players